Toulon station (French: Gare de Toulon) is a French railway station serving the city Toulon, Var department, southeastern France. It is situated on the Marseille–Ventimiglia railway.

Train services
The station is served by the following services:

High speed services (TGV) Paris - Avignon - Aix-en-Provence - Cannes - Antibes - Nice
High speed services (TGV) Bruxelles - Lille - Airport Charles de Gaulle - Lyon - Avignon - Aix-en-Provence - Marseille - Cannes - Nice
High speed services (TGV) Nancy - Strasbourg - Besançon - Dijon - Lyon - Avignon - Marseille - Cannes - Nice
High speed services (TGV) Lyon - Marseille - Nice
Night services Paris - Marseille - Nice
Local services Marseille - Aubagne - Saint-Cyr-sur-Mer - Toulon

See also 

 List of SNCF stations in Provence-Alpes-Côte d'Azur

References

Railway stations in Var
Railway stations in France opened in 1859